Kenneth "Kenny"  Mosdell (July 13, 1922 – January 5, 2006) was a Canadian professional ice hockey forward. Mosdell played in the National Hockey League (NHL) from 1941 to 1942, and 1944 to 1959, with the Brooklyn Americans, Montreal Canadiens, and Chicago Black Hawks. He was the last active NHL player to have played for the Brooklyn Americans, and also the last player until 1967 to play for an NHL team that was not part of the Original Six. Mosdell won four Stanley Cups with the Canadiens in 1946, 1953, 1956, and 1959.

Mosdell was born in Montreal, Quebec. His 1954 "Parkies" hockey card lists him as an all-star centre for the Montreal Canadiens, "starting his 11th season with the Canadiens." In the 1953-54 season, he played 67 games and had 22 goals and 24 assists. He was also a "top notch defensive player and has been used many times in penalty killing roles. During the summer he works building boxcars, swinging a sledge hammer all day to keep in top physical shape."

Mosdell died January 5, 2006, in Montreal, Quebec, at the age of 83. His health had declined steadily after suffering a stroke three years previously.

Career statistics

Regular season and playoffs

References

 Habs star Mosdell dead at 83, Belleville Intelligencer (ON). Sports, Friday, January 6, 2006, p. A20. accessed October 6, 2006.

External links

1922 births
2006 deaths
Anglophone Quebec people
Chicago Blackhawks players
Ice hockey people from Montreal
Montreal Canadiens players
Brooklyn Americans players
Stanley Cup champions
Canadian ice hockey centres